The Lyon's Mill Footbridge, also called the Devil's Chair Footbridge, is a concrete footbridge across Rock Creek in Washington, DC.  It was completed in 1934.  The eastern abutment is a remnant of the original Lyon's Mill on the site.

References

Bridges over Rock Creek (Potomac River tributary)
Concrete bridges in the United States
Pedestrian bridges in the United States
Bridges in Washington, D.C.